The Valais thaler was a coin equivalent to the French silver écu issued by the Swiss canton of Valais until 1798. It contained 26.67 g fine silver and was valued at 4 livres.

The currency of Valais was the livre (later franc or frank), divided into 10 batzen or 40 kreuzer.

The laubthaler or écu was also equivalent to 4 Franken of the Helvetic Republic in 1798.

Silver 20 creuzer were also issued

References

External links
 

Modern obsolete currencies
Currencies of Switzerland
1798 disestablishments